57th General Assembly of Nova Scotia represented Nova Scotia between March 24, 1998, and June 18, 1999, its membership being set in the 1998 Nova Scotia general election. The Liberals led by Russell MacLellan formed a minority government with the support of the Progressive Conservatives.

Division of seats

The division of seats within the Nova Scotia Legislature after the General Election of 1998

List of members

References
 

Terms of the General Assembly of Nova Scotia
1998 establishments in Nova Scotia
1999 disestablishments in Nova Scotia
20th century in Nova Scotia